Thomas W. "Tom" Alfano (born September 9, 1959) was a Republican Party member of the New York State Assembly, representing the 21st Assembly district.  The district includes Elmont, Franklin Square, North Valley Stream, Malverne, Floral Park, and West Hempstead.

Biography
He was an honors graduate of St. Pius X Preparatory Seminary. He then earned a B.A. from Fordham University, where he was valedictorian. In 1984, he received a Juris Doctor degree from the Fordham University School of Law.

Alfano worked as an attorney at several law firms in New York City, including Skadden, Arps, Slate, Meagher & Flom. He is a member of the New York State Bar Association and the Nassau County Bar Association. He served as counsel to New York State Senate Deputy Majority Leader Dean G. Skelos from 1988 to 1996. He then became the Chairman of the Town of Hempstead Public Employees Relations Board from 1990 to 1996.

He became a member of the New York State Assembly in February 1996, after winning a special election. He stepped down from the Assembly at the end of 2010.

Alfano resides in North Valley Stream, New York. He and his wife Jacqueline have three children: Thomas Jr., Jacqueline, and Stephanie.

References 

1959 births
Living people
21st-century American politicians
Fordham University alumni
Fordham University School of Law alumni
Republican Party members of the New York State Assembly
People from Valley Stream, New York
Skadden, Arps, Slate, Meagher & Flom people